Members of the Legislative Council of Northern Rhodesia from 1944 until 1958 were elected on 29 September 1944. There were eight elected members, nine appointed members and six ex officio members.

List of members

Elected members

Replacements

Nominated members

Replacements

Ex officio members

References

1944